The 1976 NCAA Division II Soccer Championship was the fifth annual tournament held by the NCAA to determine the top men's Division II college soccer program in the United States.

Loyola (MD) defeated New Haven in the final match, 2–0, to win their first national title. The final was played at Memorial Stadium in Seattle, Washington on November 27, 1976.

Bracket

Final

See also  
 1976 NCAA Division I Soccer Tournament
 1976 NCAA Division III Soccer Championship
 1976 NAIA Soccer Championship

References 

NCAA Division II Men's Soccer Championship
NCAA Division II Men's Soccer Championship
NCAA Division II Men's Soccer Championship
NCAA Division II Men's Soccer Championship